
D'Alton is both a surname and a given name of Norman origin found in Ireland and Britain and places where people from those backgrounds emigrated to. The Hiberno-Norman sept ruled over Rathconrath, previously known as D'Alton country, and surrounding areas of Westmeath from the Norman invasion of Ireland in 1169 until the Cromwellian Conquest of Ireland in 1649.

Notable people with the name include:

Surname
Eduard Joseph d'Alton (1772–1840), German engraver and naturalist
Johann Samuel Eduard d'Alton (1803–1854), German anatomist, son of Eduard d'Alton
John D'Alton (1882–1963), Irish Roman Catholic cardinal and Primate of All Ireland
John D'Alton (historian) (1792–1867), Irish lawyer and genealogist
Rob D'Alton (born 1923), Irish sailor and Olympian
Thomas d'Alton (1895–1968), Australian politician

Given name
D'Alton Corry Coleman (1879–1956), Canadian businessman
D'Alton or Dalton McCarthy (1836–1898), Canadian lawyer and parliamentarian

See also
Dalton (disambiguation)
Alton (disambiguation)

References